Auri Dias Faustino (born 17 November 1973 in Nova Aurora, Paraná), known simply as Auri, is a Brazilian retired footballer who played as a central defender.

Honours
Vitória Setúbal
Taça de Portugal: 2004–05; Runner-up 2005–06
Taça da Liga: 2007–08
Supertaça Cândido de Oliveira: Runner-up 2005, 2006

References

External links

1973 births
Living people
Brazilian footballers
Association football defenders
Campeonato Brasileiro Série A players
Campeonato Brasileiro Série B players
Coritiba Foot Ball Club players
Primeira Liga players
Liga Portugal 2 players
Vitória S.C. players
G.D. Chaves players
Gil Vicente F.C. players
Associação Naval 1º de Maio players
Vitória F.C. players
S.C. Covilhã players
Brazilian expatriate footballers
Expatriate footballers in Portugal
Brazilian expatriate sportspeople in Portugal